The Men's individual pursuit at the 2014 UCI Track Cycling World Championships was held on 27 February 2014. Twenty cyclists participated in the contest. The two fastest riders advanced to the final and race for the gold medal, while the riders ranked third and fourth raced for the bronze medal.

Medalists

Results

Qualifying
The qualifying was started at 12:00.

Finals
The finals were started at 20:25.

References

2014 UCI Track Cycling World Championships
UCI Track Cycling World Championships – Men's individual pursuit